KABOOM! is the debut studio album by American chiptune-based rock band I Fight Dragons, released in 2011 by Photo Finish Records. When the band won their release from the record label, they started offering it for free on their site. This has, however, been replaced with the band's newest album, Canon Eyes.

Versions of the band's discography on USB Dogtags, released on the official online store, included an exclusive piano-ballad version of a track, titled "I Will Wait For You If You Do For Me" at the end of the album.

Track listing

Personnel
I Fight Dragons
Brian Mazzaferri - lead vocals, acoustic guitar, chiptune (NES, SNES, NES Advantage, NES Power Pad, NES Zapper, Rock Band Guitar, Game Boy, Atari 2600, Commodore 64, Omnichord)
Hari Rao - bass
Packy Lundholm - vocals, electric guitar
Chad Van Dahm - drums
Bill Prokopow - vocals, keyboards, piano, chiptune

Additional musicians
Kina Grannis - vocals on "With You"
2010-2011 Glenbrook South High School Choir - vocals on "Suburban Doxology"
Matt Mahaffey - chiptune

Production
Matt Mahaffey - production, recording, mixing, engineering
Bill Prokopow - additional production, mixing
Chris Athens - mastering
Ryan Mauskopf - cover art
Alex R. Kirzhner - art direction, design
Carolyn Tracey - packaging production

References 

2011 debut albums
I Fight Dragons albums
Photo Finish Records albums
Chiptune albums
Nintendocore albums
Rock albums by American artists